{{DISPLAYTITLE:C27H24O18}}
The molecular formula C27H24O18 (molar mass: 636.46 g/mol, exact mass: 636.0963 u) may refer to:

 1,3,6-Trigalloyl glucose
 1,2,6-Trigalloyl glucose
 1,2,3-Trigalloyl glucose